The West Village District is a walkable urban village in the Uptown area of Dallas, Texas. West Village is located at the northern edge of Uptown along McKinney Avenue and is bordered by Lemmon Avenue, Cole Avenue, Haskell Drive and Central Expressway.

West Village proper has 88 retail, restaurant and entertainment tenants within  and contains approximately 700 residential units. This has been the catalyst for the West Village District, which contains approximately 3,600 residential units, an emerging office market (including the Richard's Group Corporate Headquarters), and an estimated 500,000 square feet of gross leasable space - all within walking distance.

History
West Village, opened in 2001, was built on an undeveloped assembly that was cleared in the 1980s for a large, master-planned urban community to be known as CityPlace. West Village was developed by Urban Partners, Henry S. Miller Interests, Phoenix Property Company, and The CityPlace Company.

The original development, designed by Washington architect David M. Schwarz, is a mixed-use development with the retail portion managed by Urban Partners and the residential component managed by CIM. The name West Village is completely an attempt to link the development to the urban neighborhood in New York City. Over subsequent years, the development has continued to stimulate further development as thousands of urban apartment homes have been constructed in the immediate vicinity.

Transportation
West Village is two miles (3.2 km) north of Downtown Dallas. The DART  and  light rail lines stop at the Uptown/CityPlace station (located within the West Village District). The McKinney Avenue Transit Authority's M-line streetcar travels from downtown Dallas to Cityplace Station and loops around the West Village.

The Katy Trail, a noted Dallas running and biking corridor, is within a block of the development.

References

External links

Transit-oriented developments in the United States
New Classical architecture
David M. Schwarz buildings